83-42 is a rocky islet in the Arctic Ocean which may be the northernmost permanent point of land on Earth. It is also sometimes referred to as Eklipse 0, or Schmitt’s Island, after its discoverer, Dennis Schmitt. When it was discovered in 1998, lichens were found growing on it, suggesting it was not one of the temporary gravel bars commonly found in that region.

The island was discovered on 6 July 2003 by an American expedition led by Dennis Schmitt and Frank Landsberger. The expedition members gave it the unofficial name 83-42, reflecting its latitude of 83 degrees 42 minutes north.

To be recognized as land area it is required that the area permanently rise out of the water, even at high tide. Given its very small size, it is doubtful whether 83-42 has this property. According to its discoverer, 83-42 is composed of rocks and boulders, a relatively resistant material, and is not just a fleeting sand and gravel bank. As of November 2007, however, the island was not officially recognized as land area.

In most geography books, Kaffeklubben Island is still listed as the northernmost point of land. If 83-42 is granted status as land, it will be the northernmost land area on Earth. Since the classification of a land area as an island is not dependent on the size of the land area, 83-42 would also become the most northerly island in the world. Other islands which have been proposed as the northernmost include ATOW1996, RTOW2001, and Oodaaq. However, these are not thought to be permanent islands, but rather semi-permanent gravel banks, moved around by waves and ice floes.

References

Uninhabited islands of Greenland